Copywrite may refer to:

 Copywriting, the process of writing the words that promote a person, business, opinion, or idea
 Copywrite (rapper) (born 1978), underground hip-hop artist from Columbus, Ohio
 Copywrite, a disk duplicator from Quaid Software